The 2010 FIBA Europe Under-18 Championship was the 27th edition of the FIBA Europe Under-18 Championship. 16 teams featured the competition, held in Lithuania from July 22 to August 1. Serbia was the defending champion. Lithuania won the title after beating Russia in the final.

Teams

Group stages

Preliminary round
In this round, the sixteen teams were allocated in four groups of four teams each. The top three qualified for the Qualifying Round. The last team of each group played for the 13th–16th place in the Classification Games.

Times given below are in CEST (UTC+2).

Group A

Group B

Group C

Group D

Qualifying round
The twelve teams remaining were allocated in two groups of six teams each. The four top teams advanced to the quarterfinals. The last two teams of each group played for the 9th–12th place.

Group E

Group F

Classification round
The last teams of each group in the Preliminary Round competed in this Classification Round. The four teams played in one group. The last two teams were relegated to Division B for the next season.

Group G

Knockout round

Championship

Quarterfinals

Semifinals

Bronze-medal game

Final

5th–8th playoffs

5th–8th semifinals

7th place playoff

5th place playoff

9th–12th playoffs

9th–12th semifinals

11th place playoff

9th place playoff

Final standings

Awards

All-Tournament Team

 Dmitry Kulagin
 Deividas Pukis
 Davis Bertans
 Nikola Silađi
 Jonas Valančiūnas

Fair Play Award

 Marijo Pervan (Croatian Physio)

Statistical leaders

Points

Rebounds

Assists

Blocks

Steals

External links
Official Site

FIBA U18 European Championship
2010–11 in European basketball
2010–11 in Lithuanian basketball
International youth basketball competitions hosted by Lithuania